Petra Smaržová (born 4 June 1990) is a disabled skier from Slovakia.

Life
Smaržová was born in Valašské Meziříčí on 4 June 1990. Smaržová speaks English, German and Slovak. She started her skiing career at the World Championships in Austria in 2002.

She was the second skier to finish in the standing women's slalom race and giant slalom race at the 2011 IPC Alpine Skiing World Championships.

Smaržová also took part in the 2014 Winter Olympic Games in Sochi, where she again competed in the Women's Slalom. She is coached by Peter Matiasko and Branislav Mazgut.

References

External links 
 

1990 births
Living people
Slovak female alpine skiers
Paralympic alpine skiers of Slovakia
Paralympic bronze medalists for Slovakia
Medalists at the 2010 Winter Paralympics
Medalists at the 2014 Winter Paralympics
People from Valašské Meziříčí
Paralympic medalists in alpine skiing
Alpine skiers at the 2010 Winter Paralympics
Alpine skiers at the 2014 Winter Paralympics